Roy Jack Mankovitz (1941–2011) was an American entrepreneur. Mankovitz worked as a rocket scientist, lawyer, inventor, entrepreneur nature-based illness prevention researcher, and author. He also described himself as a disruptive innovator.

Education
Born in New York City, Mankovitz attended Brooklyn Technical High School before graduating with a degree in engineering science from Columbia University's School of Engineering and Applied Science. Mankovitz also graduated from the University of LaVerne College of Law with a Juris Doctor degree, was a member of the California and Federal Bar, and a licensed patent attorney.

Engineering career
Mankovitz joined Rocketdyne, then a division of North American Aviation,  to design electrical control systems for rockets. He designed and developed engine control systems for Gemini and Apollo spacecraft and the Lunar Descent engine,  developed digital solenoid valve drivers that enabled the control of large valves with a minimum of electrical power.

A few years later, Mankovitz joined the Guidance and Control Division at Jet Propulsion Laboratory, where he authored computer programs and designed control systems for Mars landing vehicles and deep space probes.  He advanced to become the division representative to the Advance Technical Studies Group and authored several NASA publications in the field.  He also served as a consultant to the U.S. Air Force in the evaluation of Soviet spacecraft design.  When he began his career in the field of rocket science, the traditional approach to modeling the behavior of spacecraft was to use analog computers as the tool of choice. He chose to replace the analog computer by emulating its behavior on a digital computer, and then proceeding from there.  Some of the results of this disruptive behavior are listed under his various NASA publications.

In 1968, Mankovitz took a position as director of engineering at a division of Teledyne which produced electromechanical relays, where he developed and patented the first commercially produced solid state relays.  His entry into the commercial world of electronics was based on a bold statement he made to the president of the company that he could develop a relay that had no moving parts, and hence not wear out.  Mankovitz was hired to do just that, and the result was the formation of a new industry that produced solid state relays and circuit breakers to replace the old versions in critical applications.  He guided the development of the product line to a multimillion-dollar division, with Teledyne becoming a leader in the field of solid state relays.  Mankovitz was awarded several patents in the field.

Entrepreneurship
Mankovitz co-founded Chardonnay Corporation, which designed and produced remote-controlled systems that automated the operation of spas and swimming pools. It revolutionized the industry by completely automating the operation of pool-spa combinations.

In 1991, Mankovitz joined a start-up company, Gemstar Development Corporation as its in-house intellectual property counsel, as well as a member of its research and development team. During his tenure, he became a director and officer, and built Gemstar into a patent powerhouse in the field of consumer electronics.  One of their first projects was VCR Plus, built into virtually every VCR to simplify the recording process by replacing the old one, which was too complicated.   Along the way, he assisted in developing the on-screen television guide, widely available from most cable companies, to replace the print guide provided in newspapers.  Now, those electronic guides make it even easier to record programs using a digital recorder.  Mankovitz was a named inventor in several patents in this area, and was also the inventor of technology that makes radio listening an interactive experience,  a feature destined to be deployed by the broadcast industry.

In 1998, Mankovitz founded Patentlab, LLC, devoted to researching, designing, patenting, and licensing his intellectual property.
Mankovitz was continuing his entrepreneurial interests in the field of consumer electronics as co-founder, director, counsel, and Chief Strategy Officer for Web Tuner Corp., a Redmond, Washington, based high-tech startup devoted to the convergence of the internet and television viewing.  He was also directing his entrepreneurial interests into the field of health by co-founding Berrynol, Inc. to promote his patented technology in the area of topical photo-protective preparations.

Legal career 
From 1980 to 1991, Mankovitz was a member of several intellectual property law firms, including Reagin and King, Karon, Morrison and Savikas, and Christie Parker and Hale.  From 2001 to 2005, Mankovitz assisted Acacia Research Corp. in refining their business model, aimed at protecting and monetizing the patent rights of companies and individuals, spawning an entire industry devoted to doing just that.  He served as their senior vice president of intellectual property and provided licensing and litigation strategy to assist the company in acquiring and exploiting intellectual property portfolios.

Researcher and Author in the Field of Health

In 2005, Mankovitz founded Montecito Wellness, LLC, with his wife, Kathleen Barry, PhD.  Montecito Wellness is an organization dedicated to research in the field of primary illness prevention, where he had researched and developed technology, products and processes, based on nature, to maintain a state of wellness.  The first book he published on the subject is entitled The Wellness Project – A Rocket Scientist’s Blueprint for Health.

It includes a discussion of how he first became interested in health, how he became disenchanted with the information and counseling he was receiving from those trained in the subject, how he started over to re-research the area using the skills he had previously developed, and the startling, unexpected, and clearly disruptive conclusions that emerged from this twenty-year project.
Mankovitz published two more books on health and wellness: Nature’s Detox Plan – A Program for Physical and Emotional Detoxification; and The Original Diet – The Omnivore’s Solution. He was also working on a science-based thriller entitled The Fourth Generation, a novel on the survival of an arrogant species.

The overall premise of his research is that nature is a template for healthy living, and when married to our evolutionary heritage, optimizes our health, even to the point of overcoming past illnesses.  His research and writing includes a diet plan, detoxification program and suggested changes in lifestyle.  He had become a certified nutritional consultant, a board certified holistic health practitioner and serves on the advisory board of the Price-Pottenger Nutrition Foundation, an organization devoted to nature-based nutrition.
His inventions in the field of health include a plant-based nontoxic sunscreen (Berrynol), exercise apparatus for use with a conventional chair (Officizer), and a brassiere which facilitates the drainage of lymphatic fluid from the breast area of females (HealthBra), a factor that might lower cancer risk. However, the book which Mankovitz used as the scientific basis for his brassiere "Dressed to Kill," has been contested by mainstream doctors and scientists.

Personal

Mankovitz resided in Montecito, California, with his wife Dr. Kathleen Barry. He leaves behind three children, Jill Hurwitz, Alan Mankovitz and Andrea Mankovitz. In 2009, Mankovitz was named vice chair of the Board of Trustees at Antioch University in Santa Barbara, California. He died on July 10, 2011.

References

1941 births
2011 deaths
Columbia School of Engineering and Applied Science alumni
Brooklyn Technical High School alumni
University of La Verne alumni